The Oto-Pamean languages are a branch of the Oto-Manguean languages that includes languages  of the Otomi-Mazahua, Matlatzinca, and Pamean language groups all of which are spoken in central Mexico. Like all Oto-Manguean languages, the Oto-Pamean languages are tonal languages, though most have relatively simple tone systems. Unlike many Oto-Manguean languages that tend towards an isolating typology, they are morphologically complex headmarking languages with complex systems of conjugational classes both for verbs and nouns, and in the Pamean languages there are highly complex patterns of suppletion.

Classification
Otomian
Otomi
Northwestern Otomi
Tilapa Otomi
Sierra Otomi
Central Mexican Otomi
Toluca Otomi
Tlaxcala Otomi
Mazahua
12 different varieties
Matlatzincan
Ocuilteco/Tlawika
Matlatzinca de Oxtotilpan
Pame
Northern Pame
Central Pame
Southern Pame †
Chichimeco Jonaz

Proto-language

Four vowels with nasalization contrast are reconstructed for Proto-Oto-Pamean by Bartholomew (1989):
 *a, *e, *i, *o
 *ã, *ẽ, *ĩ, *õ

Lexical reconstructions of Proto-Oto-Pamean by Bartholomew (1989) are given below, along with synchronic Oto-Pamean languages:

References